Michael Edward Davis (born October 21, 1988) is an American professional basketball player. He played college basketball for Illinois.

High school career
Davis attended T. C. Williams High School under coach Ivan Thomas. As a senior, he averaged 17.3 points, 9.0 rebounds and 3.5 blocks helping T. C. Williams to reach a 25–4 record, Region and Patriot District titles and the quarterfinals of the Virginia Group AAA state tournament. For that he won the Northern Region Player of the Year award and a second-team All-Metro selection by the Washington Post.

College career
After graduating high school, Davis attended Illinois. In his senior season, he was the only Illini to start all 34 games where he averaged 12.5 points, 7.2 rebounds and 1.7 assists in 33 minutes, being second in the team in scoring.

When he graduated, he was second on Illinois' all-time rebounding list with 909 boards, No. 22 on Illini all-time scoring list with 1,279 points and third in school history in games played with 138.

College statistics

Professional career
After going undrafted in the 2011 NBA draft, Davis signed with BC Ferro-ZNTU of the Ukrainian SuperLeague on August 3, 2011. In 31 games, he averaged 11.2 points, 8.4 rebounds, 1.8 assists and 0.8 blocks in 28.2 minutes.

In November, 2012, Davis was selected with the 5th overall pick of the 2012 NBA Development League draft by the Reno Bighorns and was traded later to the Sioux Falls Skyforce. In 49 games, he averaged 7.4 points, 6.2 rebounds, 1.1 assists and 0.8 steals in 23.1 minutes. Later, he joined the Maratonistas de Coamo of Puerto Rico, where he averaged 12.1 points, 7.8 rebounds and 1.1 assists in seven games.

On August 30, 2013, Davis signed with BC Kyiv where he averaged 15.1 points and 6.6 rebounds in Superleague and 10.7 points and 8.7 rebounds in Eurochallenge. On February 27, 2014, Davis was waived by Kyiv. On May 3, Davis signed with Metros de Santiago of Dominican Republic.

In July, 2014, Davis signed with Adanaspor of the Turkish Basketball First League. In 36 games, he averaged 20.7 points, 9.2 rebounds, 2.2 assists, 0.9 steals and 0.8 blocks in 35.6 minutes.

In July, 2015, Davis signed with Best Balıkesir of the Turkish Basketball First League, where he averaged 14.3 points, 9.7 rebounds, 1.6 assists, 0.9 steals and 0.9 blocks in 32.1 minutes.

On November 30, 2016, Davis was acquired by the Westchester Knicks. On December 10, he made his debut for the Knicks in a 105–94 loss to the Oklahoma City Blue, recording three rebounds in 11 minutes off the bench. On February 28, 2017, he was waived by the Knicks.

For the 2017–18 season, Davis was added to the training camp roster of the Capital City Go-Go of the NBA G League. On November 5, 2018, Davis was waived by the Capital City Go-Go.

Personal life
The son of Steven and Tangie Davis, he has a sister. He majored in recreation, sport and tourism-sport management.

References

External links
Illinois bio
Profile on realgm.com
Profile on eurobasket.com

1988 births
Living people
Adanaspor Basketbol players
American expatriate basketball people in Turkey
American expatriate basketball people in Ukraine
American men's basketball players
Basketball players from Virginia
BC Kyiv players
Best Balıkesir B.K. players
Capital City Go-Go players
Illinois Fighting Illini men's basketball players
Power forwards (basketball)
Sioux Falls Skyforce players
Small forwards
Sportspeople from Alexandria, Virginia
Westchester Knicks players
T. C. Williams High School alumni